Haban Spur is a bold rock spur  north of Scarab Peak, extending northeast from the east central part of Tobin Mesa in the Mesa Range of Victoria Land, Antarctica. The feature was geologically studied by an Ohio State University field party during the 1982–83 season, and was named by the Advisory Committee on Antarctic Names after Marta A. Haban, a geologist in the party. The feature lies situated on the Pennell Coast, a portion of Antarctica lying between Cape Williams and Cape Adare.

References

Mountains of Victoria Land
Pennell Coast